Scholtzia involucrata, commonly known as spiked scholtzia, is a shrub species in the family Myrtaceae that is endemic to Western Australia.

It blooms between November and May producing pink-white flowers.

The species was first formally described by the botanist George Claridge Druce in 1917 as part of the work Nomenclatorial Notes: chiefly African and Australian as published in The Botanical Exchange Club and Society of the British Isles Report for 1916 There are three known synonyms; Baeckea obovata, Scholtzia obovata and Baeckea involucrata.

It is found on sand plains and ridges along the west coast in the Wheatbelt and Peel regions of Western Australia where it grows in sandy soils. The plant is part of the understorey in kwongan or Banksia woodland communities.

References

involucrata
Plants described in 1917